Greatest Hits is a collection of IMx's hit songs released on February 27, 2001.

Track listing
"Never Lie" (Radio Version)
"We Got It" (Radio Mix)
"Constantly"
"Extra, Extra"
"In & Out of Love" (Radio Edit)
"Please Don't Go" (Radio Edit)
"Stay the Night" (Radio Edit)
"Lover's Groove"
"Is It Me?" (feat. Monteco)
"I'm Not a Fool" (Radio Edit)
"I Don't Mind"
"Give Up the Ghost"
"Watch Me Do My Thing"
"Da Munchies"
"Tear It Up (On Our Worst Behavior)"
"Keep It on the Low"
"Feel the Funk"
"We Got It" (DJ Jam Remix Edit)
"Never Lie" (Padapella Mix)

2001 greatest hits albums
IMx albums
MCA Records compilation albums